Duck is a town in Dare County, North Carolina, United States. As of the 2020 census, the population was 746. During the peak vacation season, starting after Memorial Day, the population increases to over 20,000. Duck is the northernmost incorporated town in Dare County and the Outer Banks' newest town, incorporated on May 1, 2002. Duck offers visitors outdoor recreational activities, summer events and concerts, watersports, fine dining, shopping, art galleries, and a nationally known jazz festival, as well as the  Town Park and soundside boardwalk.

Geography
Duck is located along the northern Outer Banks, between the Atlantic Ocean to the east and Currituck Sound to the west. Originally part of Currituck County to the north, the stretch of the Outer Banks which includes Duck was transferred to Dare County in the early 20th century. The region was named for the many ducks and waterfowl in the area.

Demographics

2020 census

As of the 2020 United States census, there were 742 people, 288 households, and 202 families residing in the town.

Tourist attractions

The town park is a recreational facility with trails through the maritime forest and willow swamp. It also has an amphitheater, playground, picnic shelter, and public kayak/canoeing launch. The town has built a boardwalk which can be accessed from the park and through the commercial village. The boardwalk extends  along Currituck Sound. Duck's beach was named one of the "Top 15 Family-Friendly Beaches in America".

In October, Duck hosts its annual Jazz Festival. During the summer months, the town offers over 60 events and programs including Yoga on the Green, Movies on the Sound, a family magic show, live concerts and interactive theater. Programs are free and open to the public.

Town Council
The town of Duck encourages people to play an active role in their government. There are regular scheduled town meetings with the Town Council, where the public can address them on any matter they feel needs to be discussed. The community can also get involved and express their thoughts and concerns through attending council meetings and participating in public hearings.

Incorporation
On March 28, 2001, Representative Bill Culpepper introduced the Duck Incorporation Bill in the House. On August 29, 2001, after clearing the Senate on August 28 and the House on August 29, the bill became law. On November 6, 2001, voters voted in favor of the incorporation of Duck. Duck was incorporated as the sixth town in Dare County on May 1, 2002.

Lifesaving Station
The Caffeys Inlet Lifesaving Station was listed on the National Register of Historic Places in January 1978.

Awards and recognition
 Duck was ranked one of USA Today's "Best Coastal Small Towns" by USA Today and 10Best.

Climate
The town of Duck marks the northernmost extent of hardiness zone 8b along the east coast of the United States.

<noinclude>

Ecology

According to the A. W. Kuchler U.S. potential natural vegetation types, Duck, North Carolina would have a dominant vegetation type of Live oak/Sea Oats Uniola paniculata (90) with a dominant vegetation form of Coastal Prairie (20).

Education
Residents are zoned to Dare County Schools. Zoned schools are Kitty Hawk Elementary School, First Flight Middle School, and First Flight High School. Prior to 2004, First Flight High zoned students were zoned to Manteo High School.

References

External links 

 
 
 General Assembly of North Carolina Session 2001 House Bill 882

Beaches of North Carolina
Towns in North Carolina
Towns in Dare County, North Carolina
Outer Banks
Populated places established in 2002
2002 establishments in North Carolina
Beaches of Dare County, North Carolina